Lerissa Henry (born August 18, 1997) is a sprinter from the Federated States of Micronesia. She competed at the 2016 Summer Olympics in the women's 100 metres race; her time of 13.53 seconds in the preliminary round did not qualify her for the first round.

References

External links
 

1997 births
Living people
Federated States of Micronesia female sprinters
Olympic track and field athletes of the Federated States of Micronesia
Athletes (track and field) at the 2016 Summer Olympics
Olympic female sprinters